Live in Toronto is a live album by the band King Crimson, released by Discipline Global Mobile records in 2016. The album was recorded on 20 November at the Queen Elizabeth Theatre in Toronto, Canada during the band's The Elements of King Crimson tour of 2015. It is the second full-length release by the current seven-piece incarnation of the band and featured new compositions never before released by the band on record.

Reception

The album has received positive reviews. John Kelman, writing for All About Jazz, praises the new lineup, noting “… with the triple drum set arrangements, twin guitars, reeds and woodwinds, and bass and stick, all played by top- drawer musicians capable of respecting every song's formal construction while, at the same time, introducing interpretive variations and impressive solos, this is no tribute band; this is a Crimson… bringing the music firmly into the 21st Century.”

Regarding the new compositions, Dom Lawson writes for Prog magazine, “Part wholesale reinvention, part meticulous refinement, the… new material crackles and pops with exuberance and the infectious thump of hearts buoyed by fresh adrenalin.”

Track listing

Disc one

Disc two

Personnel
King Crimson
Front Line
 Pat Mastelotto – drums, electronic percussion
 Bill Rieflin – drums, electronic percussion, keyboards
 Gavin Harrison – drums, electronic percussion
Back Line
 Robert Fripp – guitar, guitar synth, keyboards
 Jakko Jakszyk –- guitar, vocals
 Tony Levin – basses, Chapman Stick, backing vocals
 Mel Collins – saxophones, flutes

Production
 Trevor Wilkens – audio recorder

References

External links
Tony Levin's diary entry for the Toronto shows

2016 live albums
King Crimson live albums
Discipline Global Mobile albums